The Philadelphia Fighter Wing is an inactive United States Air Force unit.  Its last assignment was with the I Fighter Command, stationed at Philadelphia Airport, Pennsylvania, where it was inactivated on 3 April 1946.

History
The wing was a World War II air defense organization, reporting to First Air Force, responsible for the air defense of the Philadelphia area.  The wing was also a training organization for fighter groups and personnel, with assigned groups subsequently deploying to overseas theaters. Not manned after July 1944, and inactivated at the end of the war.

Lineage
 Constituted as the Philadelphia Air Defense Wing on 6 August 1942
 Activated on 11 August 1942
 Redesignated Philadelphia Fighter Wing c. 2 July 1943
 Inactivated on 3 April 1946
 Disbanded on 8 October 1948

Assignments
 I Fighter Command, 11 August 1942 – 3 April 1946

Components

 33d Fighter Group: 11 August – November 1942
 58th Fighter Group: 24 October 1942 – c. 3 March 1943
 83d Fighter Group: 22 November 1943 – 10 April 1944
 87th Fighter Group: 1943 (dates undetermined)
 324th Fighter Group: 6 July – 8 October 1942
 327th Fighter Group: 27 August – 22 September 1942
 353d Fighter Group: c. 26 October 1942 – c. 27 May 1943

 355th Fighter Group: 4 March – 16 June 1943
 358th Fighter Group: 28 April – September 1943
 361st Fighter Group: 28 August – 20 September 1943
 365th Fighter Group: 19 July – 4 December 1943
 366th Fighter Group: attached 1 June 1943 – 20 November 1943
 371st Fighter Group: 30 September 1943 – 14 February 1944

Stations
 Philadelphia Airport, Pennsylvania, 11 August 1942 – April 1946

References

Notes

Bibliography

External links

Fighter wings of the United States Army Air Forces